Zinnkopf is a mountain of Bavaria, Germany.It rises 1,227 m above sea level.

Mountains of Bavaria
Chiemgau Alps
One-thousanders of Germany
Mountains of the Alps